Paul Hogan (born 1939) is an Australian actor.

Paul Hogan may also refer to:
 Paul Hogan (American football) (1898–1976), American football player
 Paul Hogan (butler), Australian-American former consul, butler, and television personality
 Paul Hogan (darts player) (born 1963), English darts player
 P. J. Hogan (born 1962), Australian film director
 J. Paul Hogan (1919–2012), American chemist (plastics inventor)